Kwadwo Antwi Atuahene (born December 17, 1984) is a Ghanaian-Canadian professional basketball player who last played for the Island Storm of the National Basketball League of Canada (NBL). He was a reserve at the 2013 NBL Canada All-Star Game, in which he represented the Central Division. Atuahene played college basketball with Arizona State after spending a season at Trinity Valley Community College in Athens, Texas. As a professional, he has previously competed with teams in Mexico, the United States, and Canada.

References

External links 
 ASU bio
 Antwi Atuahene at RealGM

Living people
1984 births
Canadian people of Ghanaian descent
Sportspeople from Mississauga
Arizona State Sun Devils men's basketball players
Basketball people from Ontario
London Lightning players
Island Storm players
Trinity Valley Cardinals men's basketball players